Mandhatra, also rendered Mandhatri, is a king of the Suryavamsha dynasty in Hinduism. He is the son of Yuvanashva, as cited in the Mahabharata. He marries Bindumati, the daughter of Yadava king Shashabindu. According to the Puranas, he had three sons, Purukutsa, Ambarisha, and Muchukunda. He is well known for his benevolence and generosity.

The hymn 134 of the tenth mandala of the Rigveda is attributed to him.

Legend

Birth 
Mandhatra's legend is cited in the Vana Parva, Drona Parva, and the Shanti Parva of the Mahabharata.

King Yuvanashva of Ayodhya once went on a hunting expedition, and in the afternoon, he became wracked with thirst. He came across the site of a yajna, and drank the sacred sacrificial butter that he observed, upon which he conceived. The Ashvin twins extracted the child from the king's womb. Even as the deities wondered how they would sustain the child, Indra produced some nectar from his fingers, which the child consumed. Drawing his strength from the hand of Indra, Mandhatra grew immensely powerful.

Conquests 
By mere willpower, he conquered the entire earth in one day. He proceeded to vanquish the kings Marutta of Ushiraviga, Asita, the Druhyu king Angara, Nriga, Brihadratha of Anga, Suna, Jaya, Janamejaya, Sudhanvan, Gaya of Kanyakubja, Angara's son Gandhara, and several others in battle. Mandhatra conquered Patala, Bhuloka, and half of Svarga, and became the ruler of the three worlds. 

The Mahabharata states that Mandhatra, the King of Ayodhya, gave away colossal statues of Rohita fish, entirely made up of pure gold and spanning several kilometres to the Brahmanas as a charity. He also gave away 10,000 padmas (10 quintillion) of cows of the best breed to the Brahmanas during his sacrifices. Mandhatra performed a hundred ashvamedha yajnas and a hundred rajasuya yajnas. 

Mandhatra was also known as Yauvanashvin (son of Yuvanashwa) and Trassadasyu (one who was feared by the wicked). He once fought Ravana, the King of Lanka in a duel, but it ended in a stalemate. 

Mandhatra married the Chandravamsha princess, Bindumati, daughter of Shashabindu, King of the Yadavas. The couple had three sons and fifty daughters. His sons Purukutsa, Ambarisha, and Muchukunda were equally illustrious. Mandhatra's daughters fell in love with the handsome ascetic Saubhari and married him. Mandhatra's eldest son, Susandhi, succeeded him.

Death 
As Mandhatra grew old, his hubris grew, and he desired to entirely conquer Svarga, the heavenly regions ruled by Indra. Indra was perturbed by this and told Mandhatra that he had not completely conquered the earth. Indra told Mandhatra that the asura Lavana, the son of Madhu and Kumbhinesi, the sister of Ravana, the king of Lanka were not a subject to his rule. A

Mandhatra invaded Madhupuri, the city of Lavanasura. Lavana possessed a divine trident given to his father King Madhu by Shiva. As long as he had the trident, nobody could vanquish Lavana in battle. Lavana wielded the trident and burnt Mandhatra and his forces, reducing them to ashes in an instant. Lavana was later slain by Shatrughna, a descendant of Mandhatra.

Notes

References
 
 
 

Characters in Hindu mythology
Solar dynasty